The 2011–12 Slovak First Football League (known as Corgoň Liga due to sponsorship purposes) was the nineteenth season of the Corgoň Liga, the first-tier football league in Slovakia, since its establishment in 1993. It began on 15 July 2011 and was completed on 19 May 2012. Slovan Bratislava were the defending champions, having won their sixth Slovak league championship at the end of the 2010–11 season.

Teams
Dubnica were relegated after finishing the 2010–11 season in 12th and last place, ending a 10-season stay in this competition. They were replaced by 2010–11 1. Liga champions AS Trenčín, who returned to the competition after a three-season absence.

Personnel and kits

Note: Flags indicate national team as has been defined under FIFA eligibility rules. Players and Managers may hold more than one non-FIFA nationality.

Managerial changes

League table

Results
The schedule consisted of three rounds. The two first rounds consisted of a conventional home and away round-robin schedule. The pairings of the third round were set according to the 2010–11 final standings. Every team played each opponent once for a total of 11 games per team.

First and second round

Third round
Key numbers for pairing determination (number marks position in 2010–11 final standings):

Top scorers

Awards

Top Eleven

Goalkeeper:  Petr Bolek (FK Senica)
Defence:   Mamadou Bagayoko (ŠK Slovan),  Jozef Piaček (MŠK Žilina),  Nicolas Ezequiel Gorosito (FK Senica),  Ricardo Nunes (MŠK Žilina)
Midfield:  Miroslav Karhan (Spartak Trnava),  Lester Peltier (AS Trenčín),  Tomáš Kóňa (FK Senica),  Marko Milinković (ŠK Slovan)
Attack:  Pavol Masaryk (MFK Ružomberok),  Tomáš Majtán (MŠK Žilina)

Individual Awards

Manager of the season
Stanislav Griga (FK Senica)

Player of the Year
Miroslav Karhan (Spartak Trnava)

Young player of the Year
Norbert Gyömbér (Dukla Banská Bystrica)

See also
2011–12 Slovak Cup
2011–12 2. Liga (Slovakia)

References

External links
 Slovak FA official site 

Slovak
Slovak Super Liga seasons
1